Atassi, also spelled Atassi is the name of a prominent family in Homs, Syria, of a noble and ancient lineage, dating back to the 15th century AD. More recently, members of the family led the national movement against the French mandate. The power and prestige of the family reached an apex at the formation of the modern Republic of Syria in 1936, when its second head of state, Hashim al-Atassi was elected president. Two out of the seven members of the constitutional assembly who drafted the first constitution of Syria in 1919 were prominent Atassis: Wasfi al-Atassi and Hashim al-Atassi. Two more scions, Lu'ay al-Atassi and Nureddin al-Atassi, were in turn installed as heads of state in the 1960s. Family members included magistrates, governors, ambassadors, heads of political parties, military officers and other public officials throughout Ottoman and modern times.

Background

Many leading family members assumed prominent religious and political positions in Ottoman, French, and Independent Syria.

The oldest mention of the family to date was in a religious manuscript dated in 1450, copied in service to one the family ancestors, Sheikh Ibrahim bin Ahmad Al-Atassi, who was named Imam of Prince Toghan bin Seqlesiz, Prince of the Turkman.  The family appeared in Hims around the end of the 15th Century.  Its ancestor, Ali Bin Khalil Atassi, was buried in 1508 in a tomb in his mosque, later known as the Atassi Mosque. The tomb exists until today.

The name al-Atassi evolved from the word "" (from "," meaning "the sneezer" in Arabic) which later changed to "" then to "" or Atassi.

Being Hashemites in origin, and its members were recognized as "Ashraf", that is descendants of prophet Muhammad, inheriting the formal address of this class in legal court documents. The ancestors of the family moved between Yemen, Hejaz and Turkey before eventually establishing their presence in Homs sometime in the 16th century CE.  Their religious authority as muftis of Homs, along with large land holdings in Homs, formed the basis of the family's wealth and influence.

The Atassi House of Homs has been divided into fifteen branches, most of which still use the name Atassi as the sole surname; however, there are two main exceptions. Al-Sayed Suleiman and Majaj are two cadet branches that are recognized as Atassi, although they have alternative surnames.

Atassi muftis of Homs and Tripoli
The office of Mufti of the town of Homs, the highest religious jurisdiction in the city, was hereditary in the Atassi family for over four centuries.  At least eighteen Atassi scholars held this position. In addition, two Atassis are known to have been Muftis of the city of Tripoli as well. The Sibaie House of Homs was another scholarly family who were often in competition with the Atassi House for the seat of the mufti, and the Sibaie were able to secure it at least four times in the town history.

The following are members of the family who attained the position of mufti:

(Dates represent period served in that position) 

Al-Shihab Ahmad Sham al-Deen ibn Khalil al-Atassi, The first.  1533-1596.
Mahmood ibn Ahmad al-Atassi.  Held position starting in 1596.
Ahmad ibn Mahmood al-Atassi, the second.  Held position until death in 1653.
Hasan ibn Mahmood al-Atassi.  Held position starting in 1653.
Mohammad ibn Ahmad al-Atassi, the first.  Held position until death in 1698.
Ali ibn Hasan al-Atassi. Held position starting in 1703.
Abdul-Wahhab ibn Ali al-Atassi.  mid-18th century, period not exactly known.
Burhan Al-Deen Ibraheem ibn Ali al-Atassi.  Late 18th century, period in Homs not known, Mufti of Homs, later of Tripoli.
Yaseen ibn Ibraheem al-Atassi, Mufti of Tripoli.
Abdul-Sattar ibn Ibraheem al-Atassi.  1805-1829.
Saeed ibn Abdul-Sattar al-Atassi.  1830-1854.
Mohammad Abu-Al-Fath ibn Abdul-Sattar al-Atassi, the second.  1852-1882.
Mohammad Khaled ibn Mohammad al-Atassi. 1885-1894.
Abdul-Lateef ibn Mohammad Al-Atassi. 1894-1914
Mohammad Taher ibn M. Khaled al-Atassi. 1914-1940.
Mohammad Tawfeeq ibn Abdul-Lateef al-Atassi. 1940-1965.
Badr Al-Deen ibn Mahmood al-Atassi. 1965-1966.
Mohammad Tayyeb ibn Abdul-Fattah al-Atassi. 1966-1984.
 Zuhair bin Abdul-Rahman Mumtaz Al-Atassi. 2017-current

Other members served as religious scholars in other capacities such as judges, chief clerks, and imams.  One mufti, Sayed Ibraheem Efendi al-Atassi, also served as Mufti of Tripoli in the late 18th century. Taher al-Atassi served as the supreme judge of Basra in Iraq, and Nablus and Jerusalem in Palestine in the late Ottoman period.

Although members of the Atassi family were naturally involved in the politics of the city of Homs by virtue of holding the mufti position and by belonging to the wealthy class and being Ashraf, it was not until the late 19th century that they started holding non-religious governmental offices.  Two scholars who held the position of mufti also held political offices: Khaled al-Atassi (1837–1908), and his son, Taher al-Atassi (1860–1940).  In 1876, Sayed Khaled Efendi Al-Atassi was elected  to the first parliament of the Ottoman Empire as the deputy from Homs and Hama. In 1922, Sayed Taher Efendi was elected to membership of the Council of the Syrian Union as the representative of Homs in the state of Damascus.  Other Atassis have since held legislative positions.

The family achieved further influence through education with a tradition of sending the young men of the family to be educated at the Imperial capital of Istanbul during the Ottoman administration, and then to the Sorbonne and other European centers of learning during the French Mandate.

Atassi heads of state
Hashim al-Atassi, President of Syria: 1936-1939, December, 1949-September, 1950, September, 1950-December, 1951, February, 1954-September, 1955
Lu'ay al-Atassi, President of the Revolutionary Council, vested with presidential powers, 1963
Nureddin al-Atassi, President of Syria, 1966–1970

Atassi members elected to the parliament and ruling councils
(dates represent year elected)
Khaled al-Atassi, elected to the Ottoman parliament, 1876.
Hashem al-Atassi, 1918, 1928, 1932, 1936.
Wasfi Beik al-Atassi, Ottoman Parliament (1914), Syrian Congress (1918)
Taher Efendi al-Atassi, 1922, member of the 15-membered Ruling Council of the Tri-State Union.
Feidy Beik al-Atassi, 1923 (State of Damascus Assembly), 1947, 1949, 1954, 1961.
Mukarram Al-Atassi, 1936, 1946.
Adnan al-Atassi, 1943, 1947, 1954.
Hilmi al-atassi, 1943.
Dr. Shawqi al-Atassi, elected to the parliament of the United Arab Republic, 1960.
Nureddin al-Atassi, 1965 (National Council)
 Ibtisam al-Sayed Suleiman al-Atassi, 2003.
 Suheir Atassi
Mansour Al-Atassi 
 Farah AL Atassi, prominent leader in Syrian politics and International affairs. A founding member of the High negotiation Committee, National Syrian Women Association, Syrian American Cultural Center, Arab American Information and Resource Center, Syria American Business Council, Women in peace and Security, the Interfaith Dialogue Initiative.

Atassi ministers in various cabinets

Hashem Al-Atassi
Faydi beik al-Atassi
Adnan al-Atassi
Mukarram al-Atassi
Jamal al-Atassi
Nureddin al-Atassi

Atassi mayors of Homs

Hasan al-Atassi, late 19th century.
Najeeb Atassi, 1879.
Omar al-Atassi, 1912.
Mohammad Al-Atassi, 1920-1930.
Feidi al-Atassi, 1931-1945.
Mukarram al-Atassi, 1950s.
Qasem al-Atassi, 1954-1957.

References
Atassi, B.H. "Bughyat Al-Nasi" the History of the Atassi Family-Bassel Atasi.
Islamic Court Registers of city of Homs.
al-Muradi, Khalil. Silk Al-Durar fi 'ayan al-Qarn al-thani sshar.
al-Bitar, Abdul-Razzaq. Hilyat al-bashar fi tarikh al-qarn al-thalith 'ashar.
As'ad (1985) Tarikh Homs, 2 volumes, Tripoli, تاريخ حمص تأليف خوري أسعد, in Arabic
Moubayed, Sami M., Steel and Silk: man and Men Who Shaped Syria 1900-2000. Cune Press, 2006.
Atassi Family Website

Syrian families
Arabic-language surnames
Al-Atassi family
Syrian people of Turkish descent
Political families of Syria